Murgun is a rural locality (an ulus) in Kurumkansky District, Republic of Buryatia, Russia. The population was 23 as of 2010. There are 7 streets.

Geography 
Zayakhay is the nearest rural locality.

References 

Rural localities in Kurumkansky District